Christian Kai John Forino-Joseph (born 26 April 2000), sometimes known as Chris Forino, is an English professional footballer who plays as a defender for Wycombe Wanderers. He is a product of the Brentford Academy and played his first senior football with non-League clubs Wingate & Finchley and Loughborough University.

Club career

Early years 
A defender, Forino-Joseph began his youth career with spells in the Soccer Chance Academy, the Brentford Academy and Cheshunt U18. After a break from football to focus on education, he signed his first professional contract with the U23 team at League Two club Colchester United in July 2018. Forino-Joseph was released when his one-year contract expired and joined Isthmian League Premier Division club Wingate & Finchley in September 2019. He made 20 appearances and scored one goal during the COVID-19-affected 2019–20 season. Forino had a spell at United Counties League Premier Division club Loughborough University during the first half of the 2020–21 season, which was again abandoned early due to COVID-19.

Wycombe Wanderers 
After a trial period, Forino-Joseph signed a one-year contract with Championship club Wycombe Wanderers on 27 April 2021. Following the club's relegation to League One shortly after he arrived at Adams Park, he had a long spell out injured and undertook a lengthy course of conditioning with the club's Development Squad physiotherapist. Forino-Joseph made his senior debut with a start in a 3–1 EFL Trophy group stage defeat to Aston Villa U21 on 31 August 2021. His second appearance came with a start in a FA Cup first round match versus Hartlepool United on 6 November and he scored the first senior goal for the club in the 2–2 draw.

International career
Forino-Joseph was eligible for England, Italy and Saint Lucia, and in December 2022, pledged his international allegiance to Saint Lucia.

Personal life 
In 2021, Forino-Joseph gave up a place at university in order to become a professional footballer. He is of Saint Lucian and Italian descent.

Career statistics

Honours 
Individual
 Wycombe Wanderers Player of the Month: December 2021

References

External links
Chris Forino-Joseph at wycombewanderers.co.uk

2000 births
Living people
Footballers from Islington (district)
English people of Saint Lucian descent
English people of Italian descent
Black British sportspeople
English footballers
Association football defenders
Isthmian League players
United Counties League players
English Football League players
Brentford F.C. players
Cheshunt F.C. players
Colchester United F.C. players
Wingate & Finchley F.C. players
Loughborough University F.C. players
Wycombe Wanderers F.C. players